The Battle of Argaon (also known as Battle of Argaum) took place on 29 November 1803, between the British under the command of Major-General Arthur Wellesley (later the Duke of Wellington) and the forces of Bhonsle of Berar and Scindia of Gwalior.

Prelude
After Raghoji II Bhonsle and Daulat Rao Scindia was defeated at the Battle of Laswari, they  moved off 28 November 1803.

Battle
The next day, three of Wellesley's battalions, which had previously fought well, broke and fled under a cannonade by the Marathas near Sirsoli, three miles south of Adgaon, and the situation was for a time very serious for the British. Wellesley, however, succeeded in rallying them, and in the end defeated the Marathas, with the loss of all their guns and baggage.

See also
 Second Anglo-Maratha War

Notes

References

External links

Conflicts in 1803
1803 in India
Battles of the Second Anglo-Maratha War
Battles involving the Maratha Empire
Battles involving the British East India Company
History of the Corps of Engineers (Indian Army)
November 1803 events